The Railway Wage Commission was a United States federal agency established in 1918 during World War I within the United States Railroad Administration.

History
The commission was authorized by President Woodrow Wilson on January 18, 1918 to examine the wages and working time of railroad employees.

In February 1918 the commission was petitioned by railroad workers to pay time and a half for work over an eight-hour day. Speaking on behalf of employers was E.F. Potter, assistant to the general manager of the Minneapolis, St. Paul and Sault Ste. Marie Railroad. The commission created the Board Of Railroad Wages And Working Conditions on May 25, 1918 to hear complaints about wages and safety. The board was dissolved on April 1, 1920.

Commissioners
James Harry Covington
Franklin Knight Lane
Charles Caldwell McChord of the Interstate Commerce Commission
William Russell Willcox
William A. Ryan
Frederick William Lehmann.

References

 
Presidency of Woodrow Wilson
Reports of the United States government
United States Railroad Administration